Charles Kidd (born 1964) is an American graphic designer known for book covers.

Early childhood 
Born in Shillington in Berks County, Pennsylvania, Kidd grew up being fascinated and heavily inspired by American popular culture. Comic books were his gateway into graphic design, with Batman and Superman populating some of his earliest childhood memories. Kidd attended Pennsylvania State University, where he graduated in 1986 with a degree in graphic design.

Career
Throughout his career, Kidd has been a graphic designer, book designer, editor, author, lecturer and musician. According to Graphic Design: American Two, he has been credited with “helping to spawn a revolution in the art of America book packaging in the last ten years.”
 One of the most consistent characteristics of Kidd’s style is the fact that his book covers don’t carry one signature look, as he states: “A signature look is crippling… [because] the simplest and most effective solutions aren’t dictated by style.”

Cover design

Kidd is currently the associate art director at Knopf, an imprint of Random House. He first joined the Knopf design team in 1986, when he was hired as a junior assistant. Turning out jacket designs at an average of 75 covers a year, Kidd has freelanced for Amazon, Doubleday, Farrar Straus & Giroux, Grove Press, HarperCollins, Penguin/Putnam, Scribner and Columbia University Press, in addition to his work for Knopf. Kidd also supervised graphic novels at Pantheon, and in 2003 he collaborated with Art Spiegelman on a biography of cartoonist Jack Cole, Jack Cole and Plastic Man: Forms Stretched to Their Limits. His output includes cover concepts for books by Mark Beyer, Bret Easton Ellis, Haruki Murakami, Dean Koontz, Cormac McCarthy, Frank Miller, Michael Ondaatje, Alex Ross, Charles Schulz, Osamu Tezuka, Gengoroh Tagame, David Sedaris, Donna Tartt, John Updike and many others. His most notable book cover design was for Michael Crichton's Jurassic Park novel, which was so successful that it carried over into marketing for the film adaptation. Oliver Sacks and other authors have contract clauses stating that Kidd design their book covers. Kidd’s influence on the book-jacket has been amply noted—Time Out New York has said that “the history of book design can be split into two eras: before graphic designer Chip Kidd and after.”

Kidd has also worked with writer Lisa Birnbach on True Prep, a follow-up to her 1980 book The Official Preppy Handbook.

Publishers Weekly described his book jackets as "creepy, striking, sly, smart, unpredictable covers that make readers appreciate books as objects of art as well as literature." USA Today also called him "the closest thing to a rock star" in graphic design today, while author James Ellroy has called him “the world's greatest book-jacket designer.”

Kidd is often asked about his  creative process. On the source of his inspiration, Kidd told Matt Pashkow in Inspirability that “for the most part I’m inspired by whatever the book is, or by the  manuscript itself.” For the USA Today, he outlined his process for  creating a cover. After closely reading the work he contacts the author, who  “has final say, so it’s a logical starting point.” “Along the way, I may or may  not involve photographers or illustrators or any amount of ephemeral detritus  that washes up on my shores in the pursuit of solving the problem. And that is  what it always amounts to: visually solving a problem.” He says that this  solution can take up to six months to find.

Kidd has often downplayed the importance of cover designs, stating, "I'm very much against the idea that the cover will sell the book. Marketing departments of publishing houses tend to latch onto this concept and they can't let go. But it's about whether the book itself really connects with the public, and the cover is only a small part of that." He is also known to be humorously self-deprecating about his work with statements such as "I piggy-backed my career on the backs of authors, not the other way around. The latest example of that is The Road, by Cormac McCarthy. I'm lucky to be attached to that. Cormac McCarthy is not lucky to have me doing his cover."

Kidd is a huge fan of comic book media, particularly Batman, and has written and designed book covers for several DC Comics publications, including The Complete History of Batman, Superman, and Wonder Woman, The Golden Age of DC Comics: 365 Days, and the aforementioned Jack Cole and Plastic Man. He also designed Mythology: The DC Comics Art of Alex Ross and wrote an exclusive Batman/Superman story illustrated by Ross for the book. Kidd once stated that the first cover he ever noticed was "no doubt for some sort of Batman comic I saw when I was about 3, enough said. Or maybe not enough said: the colors, the forms, the design. Batman himself is such a brilliant design solution." Veronique Vienne, who wrote an eponymous book about Kidd in 2006, described Kidd's Batman fandom as a "childhood obsession and lasting adult passion".

Kidd provided the cover design for Batman: The Dark Knight Strikes Again (2001, 2002).

Novels
His first novel, The Cheese Monkeys, (Simon & Schuster, 2001) is an academic satire and coming-of-age tale about state college art students who struggle to meet the demands of a sadistic graphic design instructor. The book draws on Kidd's real-life experiencess during his art studies with Lanny Sommese at Penn State.

Kidd's second novel, The Learners, finds the protagonist of The Cheese Monkeys drawn into the infamous Milgram experiment, thanks to an incidental newspaper ad assignment. The novel uses the experiment as an extended metaphor for advertising, wherein the "content" is masked and fed—sometimes unwillingly—to its consumers.

It was announced at New York Comic Con 2011 that Kidd would be writing Batman: Death by Design, an original graphic novel, which was then published in 2012.

Other books
In 1996, Kidd designed and wrote Batman: Collected. Kidd also worked with fellow Batman collector Saul Ferris on another book of a more particular subject, Bat-Manga!: The Secret History of Batman in Japan, which was released for sale in October 2008.

Music
In early 2008, Kidd started a new wave/alternative rock band, writing and recording music under the name Artbreak. He takes the role of song writing, vocals, and percussion, and while the group began as hobby, Kidd has expressed interest in making a serious project out of it. , the group performs across the United States and has a tour schedule on their MySpace. They plan to record their original songs for an album entitled Wonderground.

Animation
In 2010, Kidd collaborated with the writing staff of the animated series Batman: The Brave and the Bold on the episode "Bat-Mite Presents: Batman's Strangest Cases!" The episode contained a segment that was heavily inspired by the Batman cartoon from the 1960s.

Advocacy

In 2013, Kidd was announced as a member of the newly-formed Advisory Board of the Comic Book Legal Defense Fund, a non-profit organization founded in 1986 chartered to protect the First Amendment rights of the comics community.

Talks 
Kidd has presented lectures at Princeton, Yale, Harvard, RISD, and numerous other institutions, including the 2012 Technology, Entertainment, Design (TED) Conference, resulting in a TED Talk web video: “Designing books is no laughing matter. OK, it is,” that has over 2,000,000 hits and counting. He also returned to Penn State recently, where he presented his lecture, “Fail Better.”

Honors
 AIGA medal (2014) 
 National Design Award for Communication (2007)
 International Center of Photography's Infinity Award for Design (1997)

Personal life
Kidd lives on Manhattan's Upper East Side. He was married to the late poet and Yale Review editor J. D. McClatchy; the couple married in November 2013.

He continues to edit comics at Pantheon and frequently writes about graphic design and pop culture for publications including McSweeney’s, The New York Times, Vogue, and Entertainment Weekly.

Published works

Fiction
 The Cheese Monkeys: A Novel in Two Semesters (2001)
 The Learners: The Book After "The Cheese Monkeys" (2008)

Graphic novels
 Batman: Death by Design (2012) – art by Dave Taylor

Comics (short)
 "The Bat-Man," in Bizarro Comics (2001) – art by Tony Millionaire
 "The Trust," in Mythology: The DC Comics Art of Alex Ross (2003) – art by Alex Ross
 "Batman with Robinson the Boy Wonder," in Bizarro World (2005) – art by Tony Millionaire

Nonfiction
 Chip Kidd: Book Two: Work: 2007-2017 (2018). 
 Only What's Necessary: Charles M. Schulz and the Art of Peanuts (2015)
 
 Massive: Gay Erotic Manga and the Men Who Make It (2014)
  Go: A Kidd's Guide to Graphic Design (2013)
 The Passion of Gengoroh Tagame: Master of Gay Erotic Manga (2013)
 Shazam!: The Golden Age of the World's Mightiest Mortal (2010)
 Rough Justice: The DC Comics Sketches of Alex Ross (2010)
 True Prep: It’s a Whole New Old World (2010) – co-authored with Lisa Birnbach
 Bat-Manga!: The Secret History of Batman in Japan (2008)
 Chip Kidd: Book One: Work: 1986-2006 (2005)
 Mythology: The DC Comics Art of Alex Ross (2005)
 Jack Cole and Plastic Man: Forms Stretched to Their Limits (2001) – co-authored with Art Spiegelman
 Peanuts: the Art of Charles M. Schulz (2001)
 Batman Animated (1998) – co-authored with Paul Dini
 Batman Collected (1996)

References

Further reading
 Foreword by Chip Kidd to Just My Type by Simon Garfield, Profile Books, 2010,

External links

 
 
 Chip Kidd interviewed on Conversations from Penn State
 Inventory of the Kidd archives available at Guide to the Chip Kidd Papers, RBM 9528; Special Collections Library, Pennsylvania State University.

1964 births
American graphic designers
AIGA medalists
American gay writers
Living people
LGBT people from Pennsylvania
Penn State College of Arts and Architecture alumni
People from Shillington, Pennsylvania
People from Reading, Pennsylvania
21st-century LGBT people